Rheingau-Taunus is a Kreis (district) in the west of Hesse, Germany. Rheingau-Taunus-Kreis is part of the Darmstadt region; its main administrative seat is Bad Schwalbach. Outposted sections of the local administration are located in Idstein and Rüdesheim am Rhein.

Neighbouring districts are the Hessian districts of Limburg-Weilburg, Hochtaunuskreis, Main-Taunus-Kreis, district-free Wiesbaden and Mainz-Bingen and Rhein-Lahn which are located in Rhineland-Palatinate.

History
From 983 to 1803, the Rheingau area belonged to the Electorate of Mainz and was then merged into the new Duchy of Nassau.

The Untertaunus region was part of the Earldom of Katzenelnbogen. From 1816 onward, the whole area of the district became part of the Duchy of Nassau. After the 1866 Austro-Prussian war, Nassau was annexed by Prussia and formed the new province of Hesse-Nassau.

In 1867, the province was divided into districts. Therefore, the districts of Rheingau and Untertaunus were created.

After the Second World War and the creation of Hesse in 1946, these two districts remained unchanged. Only in 1977, because administrative borders were redrawn, the districts of Rheingau and Untertaunus merged and thus formed the Rheingau-Taunus district.

Geography

The district covers the western part of the Taunus mountains. The river Rhine forms the district's border in the south.

Politics

District council 
Recent district elections had the following results:

Coat of arms
The coat of arms combines the coat of arms of the two former districts - in the bottom right the Mainz wheel taken from the Rheingau district, in the top left the lion of Nassau from the former Untertaunuskreis.

Subdivisions

Towns
Bad Schwalbach
Eltville
Geisenheim
Idstein
Lorch
Oestrich-Winkel
Rüdesheim
Taunusstein

Municipalities
Aarbergen
Heidenrod
Hohenstein
Hünstetten
Kiedrich
Niedernhausen
Schlangenbad
Waldems
Walluf

References

External links
 
 Official website (in German)
 Rheingau Daily Photo Blog

 
Rheingau